Masters of Rock: Ramones is a compilation album by the Ramones. It was released on EMI in 2001. The record is made up of tracks from the five Ramones albums on Chrysalis Records: Brain Drain, Mondo Bizarro, Acid Eaters, ¡Adios Amigos! and Loco Live.

Track listing 
 "Pet Semetary"
 "I Believe In Miracles"
 "Poison Heart"
 "All Screwed Up"
 "Censorshit"
 "The Job That Ate My Brain"
 "Cabbies on Crack"
 "Strength To Endure"
 "I Won't Let It Happen"
 "Substitute"
 "The Crusher"
 "Surf City"
 "Blitzkrieg Bop (Live)"
 "Rock and Roll Radio (Live)"
 "Sheena Is a Punk Rocker (Live)"
 "Rock & Roll High School (Live)"
 "Rockaway Beach (Live)"
 "Bonzo Goes to Bitburg (Live)"
 "Wart Hog (Live)"
 "Merry Christmas (I Don't Want To Fight Tonight)"

References 

Albums produced by Ed Stasium
Albums produced by Daniel Rey
Albums produced by Jean Beauvoir
2001 compilation albums
Ramones compilation albums
EMI Records compilation albums